Calamagrostis breweri is a species of grass known by the common name shorthair reedgrass.

Distribution
It is native to the mountains of northern California and Oregon, where it grows in forests and meadows in subalpine and alpine climates.

Description
This is a perennial grass without rhizomes which forms tufts and bunches up to about 50 centimeters in maximum height, but generally shorter. The small, sparse leaves are mainly located at the base of the stems. The inflorescence is small, scattered and reddish, with spikelets about half a centimeter long.

References

External links
Jepson Manual Treatment
USDA Plants Profile
Photo gallery

breweri
Native grasses of California
Flora of Oregon
Grasses of the United States